State Road 54 (SR 54) is an east–west road in Central Indiana in Greene, Lawrence and Sullivan counties.

Route description
The western terminus of SR 54 is at U.S. Route 41.  SR 54 heads east from US 41 toward Linton.  Before Linton SR 54 meets SR 59 and they are concurrent until Linton.  In Linton SR 59 heads south and SR 54 heads east toward Switz City.  In Switz City SR 54 meets State Road 67.  After Switz City SR 54 meets U.S. Route 231.  Then the two route head east toward Bloomfield.  In Bloomfield US 231 heads south and SR 54 heads east.  After Bloomfield SR 54 heads east until State Road 43, where SR 54 turns southeast toward Aavoca.  In Avoca SR 54 meets State Road 37, at the eastern terminus of SR 54.

History 

Between 1917 and 1926 the today's route of SR 54 was Indiana State Road 4 and Indiana State Road 30, also at that time the route number SR 54 was routed near the today's route of Indiana State Road 63.  Before the early 1980s SR 54 went as far west as SR 63.

Major intersections

References

External links

054
Transportation in Greene County, Indiana
Transportation in Lawrence County, Indiana
Transportation in Sullivan County, Indiana